The following is a list of episodes for the children's television series, Come Outside. This list is ordered by the original air dates on BBC channels in the United Kingdom.

Episode list

Series 1 (1993)

Series 2 (1994–1995)

Series 3 (1997)

DVD/VHS releases
The BBC has released seven DVD/VHSs containing Come Outside programmes for educational use:

Animals
Geese; Spiders; Fish; Rabbits; Hedgehogs; Snails. (3 April 1995)

A Windy Day
A windy day; A rainy day; Holes in the ground; Bricks; Soap; Pencils. (2 June 1997)

Natural Materials
A woolly jumper; Stones; Wood; Clay; Paper. (1 September 1997)

Around Our Homes
Buses; A letter; Boxes; Sewage; Cleaning; Rubbish; Water. (24 November 1997)

Food
Crisps; Eggs; A carton drink; Apples; Bread. (5 January 1998)

Keeping Safe, Keeping Well
Useful Holes; Street Lamps; Boots; Brushes; Toothpaste; Marmalade (18 May 1998)

Plants and other living things
Dandelions; Carrots; Frogs; Butterflies; Bulbs. (14 September 1998)

External links

Lists of British children's television series episodes